The Belmont Club, also known as the John Young House, is a historic house on Franklin Street in Fall River, Massachusetts. The house was built in 1845, and is one of the few surviving homes built close to the city's business district soon after the devastating 1843 fire. It was purchased by the Belmont Club in 1934. The club reopened under new ownership in December 2012.

The house was listed on the National Register of Historic Places in 1983, and included in the Downtown Fall River Historic District in 1985.

See also
National Register of Historic Places listings in Fall River, Massachusetts

References

Houses in Fall River, Massachusetts
National Register of Historic Places in Fall River, Massachusetts
Historic district contributing properties in Massachusetts
Clubhouses on the National Register of Historic Places in Massachusetts
Houses on the National Register of Historic Places in Bristol County, Massachusetts